Beemerville is an unincorporated community located within Wantage Township in Sussex County, New Jersey, United States.

Space Farms Zoo and Museum, established in 1927, is a combination of a natural environment for animals and historical museum located on County Route 519 in Beemerville.

References

Wantage Township, New Jersey
Unincorporated communities in Sussex County, New Jersey
Unincorporated communities in New Jersey